HMAS Wewak (L 130) was the fifth ship of the   of heavy landing craft operated by the Royal Australian Navy (RAN).

Design and construction

The eight-vessel Balikpapan class was ordered as a locally manufactured replacement for the Australian Army's LSM-1-class landing ship medium and ALC 50 landing craft. The landing craft have a standard displacement of 316 tons, with a full load displacement of 503 tons. They are propelled by two G.M. Detroit 6-71 diesel motors, providing 675 brake horsepower to the two propeller shafts, allowing the vessels to reach . The standard ship's company is 13-strong. The Balikpapans are equipped with a Decca RM 916 navigational radar, and fitted with two  machine guns for self-defence.

The LCHs have a maximum payload of 180 tons; equivalent to 3 Leopard 1 tanks, 13 M113 armoured personnel carriers 23 quarter-tonne trucks, or four LARC-V amphibious cargo vehicles. As a troop transport, a Balikpapan-class vessel can transport up to 400 soldiers between a larger amphibious ship and the shore, or embark 60 soldiers in six-berth caravans for longer voyages. The flat, box-like keel causes the ships to roll considerably in other-than-calm conditions, limiting their ability to make long voyages.

Wewak was laid down by Walkers Limited at Maryborough, Queensland on 21 March 1972, launched on 19 May 1972, and commissioned into the RAN on 10 August 1973.

Operational history
Following the destruction of Darwin by Cyclone Tracy during the night of 24–25 December 1974, Wewak was deployed as part of the relief effort; Operation Navy Help Darwin. Wewak was the last of the 13 ships to join the operation; sailing from Brisbane on 2 January 1975, and arriving on 13 January.

Wewak was placed in reserve on 16 August 1985; one of three landing craft decommissioned for economic reasons. She was reactivated in late 2000, but only after lengthy delays, as during the intervening years, she had been used as a parts hulk for the other Balikpapans.

Decommissioning and Fate
Wewak was decommissioned on 11 December 2012.

It was later confirmed that the Philippine Navy is acquiring three more LCH from Australia, including ex-HMAS Wewak, at a token price.

References

Sources
Books

Journal articles

Balikpapan-class landing craft heavy
1972 ships